The 2012 Arkansas Razorbacks football team represented the University of Arkansas during the 2012 NCAA Division I FBS football season. The Razorbacks played their home games at Donald W. Reynolds Razorback Stadium in Fayetteville and War Memorial Stadium in Little Rock, Arkansas. They were a member of the Western Division of the Southeastern Conference.

The Razorbacks entered the season coming off of a win in the 2012 Cotton Bowl Classic, finishing the season with an 11–2 record and a No. 5 ranking in the AP poll. However, head coach Bobby Petrino was fired in the offseason after it was discovered that he covered up an extramarital affair with a member of his staff. Athletic director Jeff Long decided to hire former special teams coordinator John L. Smith, who had recently left to become the head coach at Weber State, as their head coach on a 10-month contract. Despite these circumstances, the Razorbacks were ranked No. 10 in the AP preseason poll.

The Razorbacks started their season with a win over Jacksonville State, defeating former head coach Jack Crowe, and rose to No. 8 in the AP poll. However, after an upset loss to unranked Louisiana–Monroe in overtime, they dropped out of the poll. The Razorbacks would never re-enter the poll, as this loss began a 4-game losing streak, and an eventual 4–8 finish. After the season, it was decided that Smith's contract would not be renewed. Instead, the Razorbacks chose to hire Wisconsin head coach Bret Bielema.

Personnel

Coaching staff

Recruits

Schedule

Source: ArkansasRazorbacks.com: 2012 Arkansas football schedule

Game summaries

No. 22 (FCS) Jacksonville State

Louisiana–Monroe

No. 1 Alabama

Rutgers

at Texas A&M

at Auburn

Kentucky

Ole Miss

Tulsa

at No. 12 South Carolina

at Mississippi State

No. 8 LSU

Rankings

Notes

 December 4, 2012 – Wisconsin head coach Bret Bielema has accepted the vacant coaching position at Arkansas for next season.

References

Arkansas
Arkansas Razorbacks football seasons
Arkansas Razorbacks football